Kristy Johnston (born 3 June 1965) is a retired American marathoner. Johnson started her athletic career in 1986 and won her only World Marathon Majors at the 1994 Chicago Marathon. She reappeared at Chicago from 1995 to 2000 and was the Chicago women's runner-up in 1996. Outside of Chicago, Johnston ran at the United States Olympic Trials from 1992 to 2000. After retiring from athletics in 2000, Johnston became a middle school language arts teacher in Martinsburg, West Virginia.

Early life and education
Johnston was born on 3 June 1965 in Coos Bay, Oregon. After attending Marshfield High School, she graduated from an English program at Portland College in 1988.

Career
Johnston began running in 1986 at a 5K run in Portland, Oregon. During her career, Johnston ran in various lengths of marathons ranging from 3 kilometre runs to full marathons. Her first win in a full marathon came at the 1993 Houston Marathon with a time of 2:29:05. The following year, Johnston won her only World Marathon Majors at the 1994 Chicago Marathon with a time of 2:31:34. Before competing at the 1995 Chicago Marathon, Johnston told the Daily Herald Suburban Chicago that she had "almost quit running altogether before last year's Chicago marathon" due to a long term back injury.
Johnston continued to reappear at the Chicago Marathon from 1995 to 2000 and had multiple top 8 finishes, which included second place in 1996. Outside of Chicago, Johnston competed at the United States Olympic Trials consecutively from 1992 to 2000. After reaching the semi-finals in 1992, Johnston was fifth in the 1996 Olympic Trials and second place at the 2000 Olympic Trials. After ending her athletic career in 2000, Johnston began teaching language arts to students at a middle school in Martinsburg, West Virginia.

Achievements

Awards and honors
Johnston was inducted into the Marshfield High School Athletic Hall of Fame in 2008.

Personal life
Johnston married her coach Chris Fox in 1998.

References

External links

1965 births
American female marathon runners
Chicago Marathon female winners
Living people
People from Martinsburg, West Virginia
21st-century American women